Jane Blake may refer to:

Jane Blake, character in The Secret Circle (TV series)
Jane Blake, character in Open Heart (TV series)